Bambous may refer to:
 Bambous, Mauritius, a village in the district of Rivière Noire, Mauritius
 Bambous, Gabon
 Bambous, Martinique
 "Bambous", a song by Caravan Palace on their 2008 debut album